Martina Weisenbilderová (born 13 April 1992) is a Czech handballer for DHC Slavia Prague and the Czech Republic national team.

Achievements
Czech First Division:
Winner: 2013, 2014
EHF Challenge Cup:
Winner: 2013

References

1992 births
Living people
Sportspeople from Liberec
Czech female handball players
Expatriate handball players
Czech expatriate sportspeople in Sweden
21st-century Czech women